Blazing Arrow is the second studio album by American hip hop duo Blackalicious. It was released on MCA Records on April 30, 2002. It peaked at number 49 on the Billboard 200 chart.

Critical reception

Steve Huey of AllMusic gave the album 4.5 stars out of 5, saying: "All the pieces add up to not just one of the best rap albums of 2002, but one of the richest, most captivating albums to emerge from hip-hop's artsy new underground." Chris Dahlen of Pitchfork called it "one of those classic summer albums that crams in so much sound and so much life that listening to it is like going to a block party, all-day concert and a family reunion all at the same time."

Pitchfork placed it at number 46 on the "Top 50 Albums of 2002" list. Exclaim! listed it as one of the Top Ten albums of 2002. Kludge included it on their list of best albums of 2002.

Track listing

Charts

Weekly charts

Year-end charts

References

External links
 
 

2002 albums
Blackalicious albums
MCA Records albums
Albums produced by Questlove
Albums produced by DJ Shadow
Albums produced by Hi-Tek